William Henry Gillespie (14 August 1893 – 23 April 1961) was a New Zealand politician of the National Party. He was a cabinet minister from 1960 to 1961.

Biography

Gillespie was born in 1893. He received his education at Ashley Gorge and Oxford District High School, and left school aged 13 following his father's death.

From 1958 to 1960 he was Shadow Minister of Agriculture and Lands while National was in opposition. At the formation of the Second National Government he was appointed a member of Cabinet, having been designated as  Minister of Agriculture on 12 December 1960. He was Chairman of the Board of Canterbury Agricultural College from 1951 until 1960.

Notes

References

External links 

1893 births
1961 deaths
New Zealand National Party MPs
Members of the Cabinet of New Zealand
Members of the New Zealand House of Representatives
New Zealand MPs for South Island electorates
20th-century New Zealand politicians
Chancellors of Lincoln University (New Zealand)